Vier Gebroeders (English: Four Brothers) or Mamija is a Tiriyó village in the Coeroeni resort of the Sipaliwini District of Suriname. Vier Gebroeders is close to the Brazilian border. The village is not named after four brothers, but after the Vier Gebroeders Mountain (560 metres) with four peaks.

In October 1935, the area was first explored by A.J.H. van Lynden. Vier Gebroeders does not have a school or a clinic.

In 2009, a contract was signed with the Dalian company, to construct a road from Pokigron to Brazil via Vier Gebroeders, however the project has not started as of May 2020. 

Vier Gebroeders is served by the Vier Gebroeders Airstrip.

References

Indigenous villages in Suriname
Populated places in Sipaliwini District